Neodactria zeellus is a moth in the family Crambidae. It was described by Charles H. Fernald in 1885. It is found in North America, where it has been recorded from Alberta, Florida, Indiana, Maine, Maryland, Massachusetts, Mississippi, Ohio, Oklahoma, Pennsylvania and Tennessee.

References

Crambini
Moths described in 1885
Moths of North America